Leza Awards (Amharic: ለዛ ሽልማት) is an Ethiopian annual film and music award held in Hilton Hotel, in Addis Ababa, Ethiopia since 2010. The award show broadcast on television channels and radio on Sheger FM 102.1. 

In 2014, Leza introduced lifetime achievement award for outstanding pioneers of Ethiopian musicians. The Leza Radio Listeners' Choice Award gives both film and music recognition.

Overview
Leza Awards is an annual music and film award where performers of both awarded for contribution of their work with achieve market. In 2014, Leza introduced lifetime achievement award that recognize Ethiopian pioneer musicians. In 2015, seven pioneers who were deemed in contribution of Ethiopian music awarded. The finalists judged based on public vote which takes for one month. The Leza Radio Listeners' Choice Award gives both film and music recognition. Leza awards for primarily in 6 categories:
 Best Music Album
 Best Music Single
 Best Music Video
 Best New Album
 Best Feature Film 
 Lifetime Achievement

List of awards

References

Ethiopian film awards
Ethiopian music awards